Bello Babatunde Martins (born 11 May 2003) is a Nigerian professional footballer who plays for Future FC, in the Egyptian Premier League.

Club career 
Bello made his professional debut for Sunshine Stars on the 13 June 2021, starting the NPFL game against Enugu Rangers.

Midway through the following season, he switched to Akwa United, the Nigerian League reining champions, where he quickly became one of the most prominent players.

Attracting the attention of clubs between Sweden and Egypt with his NPFL form, he eventually signed for Egyptian Premier League side Future FC, in Octobre 2022.

International career 
Babatunde Bello was first called to the Nigeria football team in May 2022 for the friendly matches against Mexico and Ecuador.

References

External links

2003 births
Living people
Nigerian footballers
Association football midfielders
People from Ekiti State
Sunshine Stars F.C. players
Akwa United F.C. players
Nigeria Professional Football League players